General elections were held in Japan on 22 June 1980. They were the result of a vote of no confidence brought by the Japan Socialist Party (JSP) on 16 May regarding corruption and rises in public utility charges as reasons for the House of Representatives of Japan (lower house) to withdraw its backing from the government.

Unexpectedly, 69 Liberal Democratic Party (LDP) members of the Diet from the Fukuda Takeo, Miki Takeo and Hidenao Nakagawa factions abstained from voting on the motion. The government was defeated by 56 votes in total of 243 and resigned.

For the first time, elections for both houses of the Diet were called in June 1980. During the election, Prime Minister Masayoshi Ōhira, the leader of the Liberal Democratic Party died during the campaign. Ōhira had expected the vote of no confidence to fail, and was visibly shaken when it passed by a margin of 243–187.  Sixty-nine members of his own LDP, including Fukuda, abstained. Given the choice of resigning or calling new elections, Ōhira chose the latter and began campaigning for LDP candidates. He was hospitalized for exhaustion on 31 May and died of a massive heart attack 12 days later.

Chief Cabinet Secretary Masayoshi Ito acted in Ōhira's place as deputy after his death. In the elections of both the houses LDP gained a majority. The election results for the lower house are shown in the table below. Yoshio Sakurauchi, the Secretary General of LDP, led the LDP to its greatest victory in fifteen years, capitalizing on the "sympathy vote" generated by Ōhira's death. The Prime Minister was succeeded by Zenkō Suzuki after the election.

Results

By prefecture

Notes

References
Mahendra Prakash (2004), Coalition Experience in Japanese Politics: 1993-2003, New Delhi: JNU.

Japan
General elections in Japan
General election
Japanese general election
Election and referendum articles with incomplete results